Thomas Grimm (born April 3, 1959, Lüscherz) is a Swiss jurist and football functionary, who has served as the president of the Ukrainian Premier League since 2018.

Biography
Grimm was born on April 3, 1959 in the Swiss village of Lüscherz. In 1987 he graduated as a jurisprudence faculty of the University of Bern. He headed a law department of UEFA from 1992 to 1995. During that time Grimm also participated in various working committees of UEFA. Between 1996 and 2001, he worked as a lawyer for CWL Telesport and Marketing AG (later known as Infront Sports & Media).

Between 2002 and 2005, Grimm worked as a secretary on a commission that was reevaluating the FIFA statute.

Between 2007 and 2009, he was the president of the Swiss football club BSC Young Boys and between 2009 and 2011 he was the president of the Swiss Football League.

Concurrently between 2009 and 2013, Grimm also worked in various positions for FIFA, UEFA, and EFPL as well as on the board of directors for the small Swiss football team FC Biel-Bienne.

Later he also worked as a legal adviser for the Ukraine national football team during the Euro 2016 and for the Football Federation of Ukraine on questions regarding the final match of the 2017-18 UEFA Champions League at Olimpiyskiy National Sports Complex.

In 2018 Grimm was elected as the president of the Ukrainian Premier League by majority of votes. Grimm's contract expired on 5 April 2020 and he expressed no interest to run for another term, however due to the ongoing COVID-19 pandemic elections were suspended and governing of the league was taken over by its general director until next elections.

References

External links
 Der FC Biel ist für uns in der Liga ein Vorbild. Erich Fehr website.

1959 births
Living people
People from Seeland District
University of Bern alumni
20th-century Swiss lawyers
Ukrainian Premier League presidents
Swiss Super League
BSC Young Boys
Swiss expatriates in Ukraine
Swiss sports executives and administrators